Germany's Next Topmodel, Cycle 7 is the seventh season of the show that was aired on the German television network ProSieben. The show started airing on 23 February 2012. As in the last preceding years, a preselection was done and open castings were not part of the show. The first episode started with 50 semifinalists.

As in cycle 6, the judging panel consists of Thomas Hayo and fashion designer Thomas Rath. The winner of the competition was 17-year-old Luisa Hartema from Leer.

Fourth placer Kasia Lenhardt committed suicide in 2021. 

The international destinations for this cycle were set in Phuket, Los Angeles, New York City, San Diego, Tahiti, Cancún and Paris.

Episode summaries

Episode 1: 50 Girls
Original airdate: 23 February 2012

The competition began with 50 semi-finalists, along with wildcard Melek Civantürk, who reached the finals of the previous cycle but withdrew after being diagnosed with cancer. After interviews with the judges, 20 of them were eliminated, and the remaining 30 walked in a fashion show for Guido Maria Kretschmer. Luisa, Melek and Natalia were chosen to open the fashion show, and Luisa was chosen to close it. Afterwards, five more contestants were eliminated, and the remaining 25 receive the news that the next round of the competition would take place in Thailand.

Episode 2: Thailand
Original airdate: 1 March 2012

After arriving in Thailand, the finalists were set a challenge in which they had to walk in Asian outfits. Following this, they flew to Phuket, and the winners of the challenge, Lisa and Dominique, flew first class with Heidi Klum. In Phuket, the contestants did a photo shoot on a beach and for their next challenge shot a commercial for Asian food. The winners of the challenge were Annabelle and Sara, and they won a night in Bangkok.

For the live walk, the contestants modeled designs by Tube Gallery. Abiba, Laura W. and Romina were the first contestants to be eliminated.

First challenge winner: Dominique Miller & Lisa Volz
Second challenge winner: Annabelle Rieß & Sara Kulka
Eliminated: Abiba Bakayoko, Laura Wittek & Romina Djurovic
Featured photographer: Derek Kettela

Episode 3: Berlin Fashion Week
Original airdate: 8 March 2012

The girls go to castings for Berlin Fashion Week. At the casting for Kaviar Gauche Shawny performs best and gets booked for the show. After the show the girls have a photo shoot for German Gala. Kasia, Anelia and Michelle Luise are deemed best. Afterwards the girls go to a casting for judge Thomas Rath. Luisa, Sarah-Anessa, Natalia, Shawny, Inga and Annabelle are booked for the show that is already Shawny's second job. Although Heidi is absent at panel Valerie-Charlotte, Franziska, Sabine and Isabell are eliminated.
 
Booked for job: Shawny Sander (2x), Luisa Hartema, Sarah-Anessa Hitzschke, Natalia Kowalczykowska, Inga Bobkow & Annabelle Rieß
Eliminated: Franziska Poehling, Isabell Janku, Sabine Snobl & Valerie-Charlotte Kirchner von Schröder

Episode 4: A dream comes true: Hollywood is waiting
Original airdate: 15 March 2012

The week starts with a challenge the girls have to get perfect make-up while they are sitting in a drifting car. Kasia and Luisa are declared to winners. At home the girls have an emotions training with Michelle Rodriguez. At the photo shoot Melek, Evelyn, Sarah-Anessa, Sara and Anelia struggle. At panel Anelia, Jasmin and Sarah-Anessa struggle on the runway this making them land in the bottom three. Anelia gets eliminated for failing at both; photo shoot and runway.

Challenge winner: Luisa Hartema & Kasia Lenhardt
Wall of fame: Shawny Sander
Bottom three: Anelia Moor, Jasmin Abraha & Sarah-Anessa Hitzschke
Eliminated: Anelia Moor
Featured photographer: Rankin
Guest judge: Anne Vyalitsyna

Episode 5: The L.A. animal shooting
Original airdate: 22 March 2012

In the beginning the girls have their makeover where Natalia refuses her makeover and annoys the judges. Sarah-Anessa starts crying when her hair is dyed from blond to black. The girls have a photo shoot with lizards. Michelle Luise is deemed worst while Sarah-Anessa, Luisa, Lisa and Diana perform best. At a casting for an editorial for Broadway NYC Fashion Kasia, Luisa, Dominique, Sarah-Anessa, Maxi, Annabelle and Shawny reach the second round. In the end it's a race head to head between Kasia and Annabelle resulting in Annabelle's second job. At panel the girls have to choose their styling, outfit and music themselves. While Dominique is deemed best for her outfit, Sarah-Anessa has the best walk and music thus making her get a place at the wall of fame. Michelle Luise and Jasmin land in the first bottom two where Michelle Luise gets eliminated because of her bad photo shoot, walk and outfit. Melek and Natalia land in the second bottom two resulting in Natalias elimination.

Booked for job: Annabelle Rieß
Wall of fame: Sarah-Anessa Hitzschke
First bottom two: Michelle Luise Lafleur & Jasmin Abraha
First eliminated: Michelle Luise Lafleur 
Second bottom two:  Melek Civantürk & Natalia Kowalczykowska 
Second eliminated:  Natalia Kowalczykowska
Featured photographer: Robert Erdman
Featured client: Broadway NYC Fashion

Episode 6: It go high up, Irish Dancing
Original airdate: 29 March 2012

The girls have a casting for Emmi AG where Luisa, Diana, Kasia, Inga and Lisa reach the second round where Diana is booked for her first job and thus travels to Tahiti for the job. At the photo shoot Luisa and Sarah-Anessa perform best and go to amfAR-gala with Heidi wearing dresses designed by Roberto Cavalli whom the girls met before the gala. The other girls train Irish Dancing with guest judge Coco Rocha where Dominique and Melek perform best. Sara is also noticed for practicing until midnight what she is praised for by the judges. The girls do Irish Dancing instead of catwalk. Maxi is eliminated after denigrating Diana and a bad performance at panel.

Booked for job: Diana Ovchinnikova
Guest judge: Coco Rocha
Wall of fame: Evelyn Keck
Eliminated: Maxi Böttcher
Featured photographer: Warwick Saint
Featured client: Emmi Dairy Products

Episode 7: Rock-star shooting, NY Fashion Week
Original airdate: 5 April 2012

The photo shoot is about Stage diving where no girls performs bad. Luisa, Inga and Evelyn are invited to New York Fashion Week castings. The three girls meet Elsa Hosk, who notes that Luisa has huge potential, at a training for castings as well as Toni Garrn and Doutzen Kroes at a gala. Tara Subkoff books Luisa for her presentation. At a casting for Jad Ghandour's fashion show Luisa performs best and is booked for his show. She is also chosen to open and to close his show and to shoot the look book. Afterwards the girls go to a casting for Korto Momolu, the runner-up of Project Runway (season 5) who books all three girls, Luisa, Inga and Evelyn, for her presentation. Back in LA the girls have to walk in High Fashion outfits where Jasmin is deemed worst and therefore eliminated. Luisa gets a place at the wall of fame because of her three jobs and great photo. The remaining girls travel to Cancun.

Booked for job: Luisa Hartema, Evelyn Keck & Inga Bobkow
Wall of fame: Luisa Hartema
Eliminated: Jasmin Abraha
Featured photographers: Marc Baptiste, Anders Hallberg & Seth Sabal

Episode 8: Amazons
Original airdate: 12 April 2012

This week the girls have to play the role of Amazons where Dominique and Lisa are deemed best and Diana and Shawny are deemed worst. At a casting for German Cosmopolitan the girls have to dance in pairs. Luisa and Shawny are booked. This week's challenge is to design a traditional Mexican outfit. In the end it's a race head to head between Sara and Evelyn with Sara winning the challenge. Annabelle struggles on the runway and lands in the bottom two along with Diana. In the end Annabelle is eliminated.

Challenge winner: Sara Kulka
Booked for job: Luisa Hartema & Shawny Sander
Wall of fame: Dominique Miller
Bottom two: Annabelle Rieß & Diana Ovchinnikova
Eliminated: Annabelle Rieß
Guest judge: Erin Wasson

Episode 9: Fashion show in Mexico
Original airdate: 19 April 2012

All the girls are booked for the show of Mexican designer Lydia Lavin. She has to decide between Melek, Lisa and Dominique who's going to wear the wedding dress. In the end Lisa is chosen. At the show Evelyn, Kasia and Luisa stumble while Lisa is deemed best. In this week's photo shoot the girls have to jump out of a burning house. Melek, Kasia and Luisa are deemed worst while Lisa performs best. At a casting for Opel Sara reaches the second round for the first time along with Lisa and Inga. In the end Lisa wins the casting. At panel Sara reveals that she has worked in a Strip club because of financial problems. The girls have to walk in lingerie and Victoria's Secret like. While Diana, Evelyn, Dominique and Lisa perform best on the runway Melek, Kasia and Luisa struggle. Melek gets eliminated for her lack of Sexiness. Judge Thomas Rath has to choose three girls he takes to Paris. He chooses Evelyn and Diana for their great walks and Luisa in spite of her weak week because of her huge potential. Lisa gets on the Wall of Fame because of her almost perfect week.

Booked for job/Wall of fame: Lisa Volz
Eliminated: Melek Civantürk

Episode 10: Paris
Original airdate: 26 April 2012

The three girls that have been picked the week before go to a casting for Claudine Ivari's show at Paris Fashion Week. Luisa is the only one to be booked. The other girls are doing sports with Heidi. At the photo shoot Luisa, Dominique, Sara, Kasia and Laura perform best while only Shawny struggles. At panel Laura struggles on the runway thus making her land in the bottom two along with Shawny. In the end Shawny gets eliminated even though Shawny has been cast for three jobs already and Laura didn't get a single one, but because Laura has been much stronger on the runway than Shawny at the photo shoot. Kasia lands on the Wall of Fame although Luisa was booked for Paris Fashion Week and had a great week.
 
Booked for job: Luisa Hartema
Challenge winner/immune: Dominique Miller
Wall of fame: Kasia Lenhardt
Bottom two: Laura Scharnagl & Shawny Sander
Eliminated: Shawny Sander
Featured photographer: Kristian Schuller

Episode 11: Molotow-Cocktail
Original airdate: 3 May 2012

The girls have a runway training with Naomi Campbell. The judges surprised the girls when telling them one girl will be eliminated outside the judging panel. Laura, Sarah-Anessa and Inga land in the bottom three. Laura is eliminated. The girls film a video where they have to dodge a molotow-cocktail in matrix-style. Luisa, Evelyn and Lisa win the challenge to mix different kind of styles to create a new fashion relevant one. At panel Inga is eliminated for always being average.

Bottom three: Inga Bobkow, Laura Scharnagl & Sarah-Anessa Hitzschke
Eliminated outside of judging panel: Laura Scharnagl
Wall of fame: Dominique Miller
Bottom two: Inga Bobkow & Lisa Volz
Eliminated: Inga Bobkow

Episode 12: Toothpaste, Animals and Robots
Original airdate: 10 May 2012

The week starts with a casting for blend-a-med. Luisa, Dominique, Kasia, Sarah-Anessa and Diana reach the second round. Dominique wins the casting and is booked for a commercial. This week the girls have a bodypainting photo shoot. Luisa, Kasia, Evelyn and Sara are deemed best while Sarah-Anessa, Diana and Dominique struggle. Sarah-Anessa, Diana, Sara are chosen to be interviewed in E! Entertainment News. Kasia wins this week's challenge to pose with robots and chooses Sara to share her price. At panel the girls have a press training after the runway. Sara performs best at the training while Dominique struggles. In the end Lisa is eliminated for not being edgy enough. Sara and Diana land in the bottom two, but are both saved.

Booked for job: Dominique Miller
Challenge winner/Wall of fame: Kasia Lenhardt
Bottom three: Diana Ovchinnikova, Sara Kulka & Lisa Volz
Eliminated: Lisa Volz
Second eliminated: None
Featured client: Blend-A-Med/Procter & Gamble

Episode 13: Kickboxing and Mermaids
Original airdate: 17 May 2012

The remaining seven girls have to organize a fashion show, where Dominique is deemed best while Diana is criticized for her body, especially for her hips once again. The girls have a casting for German Shape. Sara and Kasia are the last two, with Sara booked for the job. At the photo shoot the girls have to pose as mermaids between dead fish. All the girls do a great job. At panel Diana quits the competition because of problems in her family. Luisa struggles on the runway and is not deemed best for the first time since almost five weeks. But she isn't eliminated due to her huge potential and her fantastic photo. Sara lands on the wall of fame for the first time.

Challenge winner: Dominique Miller
Booked for job: Sara Kulka 
Quit: Diana Ovchinnikova
Wall Of fame: Sara Kulka
Eliminated: None
Featured photographer: Enrique Badulescu
Guest judge: Carolyn Murphy

Episode 14: Underwater Shooting
Original airdate: 24 May 2012

In the beginning Evelyn quits the competition because of a severe disease in her family. Heidi mentioned she was sure Evelyn would reach the final. This week's casting is for Gillette Venus Kasia, Luisa, Sarah-Anessa and Sara reach the second round. Luisa and Sarah-Anessa reach are booked for the commercial. Luisa is chosen to play the main role. This is also Luisa's seventh job, what makes her the German 'Next Topmodel' contestant with the highest number of jobs during the show, followed by Jolina Fust from cycle 9 and Janina Schmidt and Christina Leibold from cycle 3. Thomas Hayo does a photo shoot with the girls to teach them how to do jumping poses in fashion editorials with the assistance of Jessica Gomes.  

At this week's underwater photo shoot the girls have to pose with a male model. All the girls perform well. At panel Dominique and Sara land in the bottom two but are not eliminated. Sarah-Anessa advances to the final even though she only got two jobs while Luisa was booked for her seventh job this week, is the cycle's catwalk queen and praised for her huge potential all the time.

Quit: Evelyn Keck
Booked for job: Luisa Hartema & Sarah-Anessa Hitzschke 
Bottom two: Dominique Miller & Sara Kulka
Eliminated: None
Advanced to final: Sarah-Anessa Hitzschke

Episode 15: Cosmopolitan Cover
Original airdate: 31 May 2012

The girls do a photo shoot for German Cosmopolitan, what is one of the winning prices. All girls do a good job while Dominique excels. They have a runway training with Miranda Kerr, who says the girls have been handpicked very well and also notes that Luisa has huge potential. The top 5 walk features three different walks at panel where, Luisa reaches the final. Sara is eliminated, what doesn't come as a surprise, with even Sara saying she will be eliminated before. Kasia is the third girl to reach the final. Dominique starts crying when Kasia returns as a finalist but Dominique, who is called out alone is also able to reach the final, what marks the first time there are four finalists.

Immune: Sarah-Anessa Hitzschke
Eliminated: Sara Kulka

Episode 16: Final at the Lanxess Arena
Original airdate: 7 June 2012

Kasia is eliminated first after a quick change fashion show, with only the four finalists walking. After an online voting between the girls, who did not reach the final, Sara is chosen to open the top-18-walk. After the walk Dominique is eliminated leaving Luisa and Sarah-Anessa. To nobody's surprise Luisa, who has the biggest fan base, wins due to her huge potential, being the cycle's catwalk-queen and most photogenic girl and having been booked for the highest number of jobs in Germany's Next Topmodel's history.

Final four: Dominique Miller, Kasia Lenhardt, Luisa Hartema & Sarah-Anessa Hitzschke
Eliminated: Kasia Lenhardt
Top 18 walk opener: Sara Kulka
Final three: Dominique Miller, Luisa Hartema & Sarah-Anessa Hitzschke	
Eliminated: Dominique Miller	
Final two: Luisa Hartema & Sarah-Anessa Hitzschke	
Germany's Next Topmodel: Luisa Hartema

Contestants

(ages stated are at start of contest)

Summaries

Results table

 The contestant quit the competition
 The contestant was immune from elimination
 The contestant won the wall of fame photo
 The contestant was in danger of elimination
 The contestant was eliminated
 The contestant won the competition

Photo shoot guide
 Episode 2 photo shoot: Bikini shots in Thailand  
 Episode 4 photo shoot: Girl's night out with Heidi Klum
 Episode 5 photo shoot: Beauty shot with reptiles
 Episode 6 photo shoot: Suspended in the air
 Episode 7 photo shoot: Stage diving rock stars
 Episode 8 photo shoot: Jungle warriors
 Episode 9 photo shoot: Jumping outside a burning house
 Episode 10 photo shoot: Flying parachutes couture
 Episode 11 video shoot: High end fashion film
 Episode 12 photo shoot: Animal body paint
 Episode 13 photo shoot: Mermaids
 Episode 14 photo shoot: Underwater romance
 Episode 15 photo shoot: Surprised photo shoot

External links 
 

Germany's Next Topmodel
2012 German television seasons
Television shows filmed in Thailand
Television shows filmed in California
Television shows filmed in New York City
Television shows filmed in French Polynesia
Television shows filmed in Mexico
Television shows filmed in France